Carex juncella is a species of flowering plant belonging to the family Cyperaceae.

Synonym:
 Carex nigra subsp. juncella Á.Löve & D.Löve
 Carex vulgaris var. juncella Fr.
 Carex wiluica Meinsh.

References

juncella